Tribute is a live album by British heavy metal vocalist Ozzy Osbourne, featuring his work with hard rock guitarist Randy Rhoads, in whose honor the album was released. The album was released in May 1987, five years after the death of Rhoads, then it was reissued on 22 August 1995, and again remastered and reissued in 2002. It peaked at number 6 on the US Billboard 200 chart.

Background
The album was released in memory of Randy Rhoads, guitarist for Osbourne's band between 1979 and 1982 who died in a plane crash while on tour in Florida in 1982. The album also includes studio outtakes of Rhoads recording the classical-influenced acoustic guitar piece "Dee", which Rhoads wrote for his mother Delores and which was originally included on Osbourne's debut solo album Blizzard of Ozz.

A live album consisting entirely of renditions of Black Sabbath songs was originally planned to be recorded at Toronto's Maple Leaf Gardens in mid-1982 with Rhoads. Rhoads and drummer Tommy Aldridge felt that they had established themselves as recording artists and an album of cover songs would be a step backwards artistically, and they refused to participate. Bassist Rudy Sarzo was uncomfortable with refusing to perform, not having the same recording pedigree of his bandmates, but he stood with them and the trio informed management of their decision. Osbourne felt betrayed and his relationship with Rhoads never fully recovered. Plans for this proposed live album crumbled upon Rhoads' sudden death weeks later, though the plan was resurrected with the release of Speak of the Devil later that year with Sarzo and Aldridge joined by Night Ranger guitarist Brad Gillis.

Overview
The majority of Tribute, from "I Don't Know" through to "Paranoid", was recorded live in Cleveland, Ohio on 11 May 1981. "Goodbye to Romance" and "No Bone Movies" are taken from an earlier English gig in support of the Blizzard of Ozz album, possibly from Southampton on 2 October 1980. These two tracks feature bassist Bob Daisley and drummer Lee Kerslake.

The versions of "Iron Man", "Children of the Grave", and "Paranoid" featured on Tribute were originally intended to be included on the 1982 live album Speak of the Devil. In the months following Rhoads' death, these three songs were intended to be released in tribute to the guitarist, but a record company decision was made to save them for a full album to be released at a later date.

The recording of "Crazy Train" that appears on this album was also released as the album's only single on 10 February 1987, along with an accompanying music video. The album's cover photo was taken at a performance in Rosemont, Illinois on 24 January 1982, by photographer Paul Natkin.

The operatic music which opens Tribute, as well as all of Osbourne's live shows of that era, is "O Fortuna" from the Carmina Burana scenic cantata by Carl Orff. This introductory music was omitted from the 1995 remaster, with opening track "I Don't Know" subsequently being shortened to 4:43.

Track listing

Personnel
Ozzy Osbourne - vocals, executive producer
Randy Rhoads - guitar
Rudy Sarzo - bass
Tommy Aldridge - drums
Lindsay Bridgwater - keyboards
Bob Daisley - bass on "Goodbye to Romance" and "No Bone Movies"
Lee Kerslake - drums on "Goodbye to Romance" and "No Bone Movies"

Production
Max Norman - producer, engineer
Brian Lee and Bob Ludwig - 1995 remastering
Bruce Dickinson - 2002 edition executive producer
Chris Athens - 2002 remastering

Charts

Album

Singles

Certifications

References

External links
 

1987 live albums
Ozzy Osbourne live albums
Albums produced by Max Norman
Live albums published posthumously
Collaborative albums
Epic Records live albums
Columbia Records live albums
Randy Rhoads
Albums in memory of deceased persons